Ashirbek Torebayuly Sygai (Áshirbek Tórebaıuly Syǵaı) (January 1, 1947 – November 28, 2014) was a theater critic, translator, educator, and professor at the Kazakh National University of Arts.

Life
Ahirbek Sygai was born in South Kazakhstan region.

Early life and education

Legacy
Sygai authored several books, including "Іңкәр шақ" (1978), "Сыр сандық" (1981), "Сахнаға сапар" (1990), "Жарнама алдындағы ой" (1993), "Сахна саңлақтары" (1998), "Театр тағылымы" (2003), "Толғам" (2004), "Талдықорған театры" (2005).

References

Kazakhstani theatre critics
1947 births
2014 deaths